The pied heron (Egretta picata), also known as the pied egret is a bird found in coastal and subcoastal areas of monsoonal northern Australia as well as some parts of Wallacea and New Guinea.

Taxonomy
The species was originally described by ornithologist John Gould in 1845.  Recent taxonomists put this species in the genus Egretta. There are no recognised subspecies.

Description
It is a small heron, 43–55 cm long, with dark slaty wings, body, and crested head, with a white throat and neck. The appearance is similar to the white-necked heron. Males (247–280 g) are heavier than females (225–242 g), but the two are similar in appearance.

Immature birds lack the crest as well as the dark colouring on the head and may look like small versions of the white-necked heron. The juveniles were once classified as a separate species.

Distribution and habitat
Its habitat mainly comprises a range of wetlands and wet grasslands.

Behaviour

Call
The call of the pied heron is a loud 'awk' or 'ohrk' in flight. Soft cooing is given around the nest. Little else is known about vocalisations.

Breeding
Breeding takes place from February to May. It nests in trees above the water, including mangroves, often colonially with other species of heron. 1–2 blue-green eggs are laid in a shallow platform of sticks.

Feeding
It feeds on insects, frogs, crabs, fish and other small aquatic animals. Insects are the most important source of food. It may feed alone or in groups of up to a thousand individuals.

References

Bibliography
 Marchant, S.; & Higgins, P.J. (Coordinators). (2000). Handbook of Australian, New Zealand and Antarctic Birds. Vol.1: Ratites to Ducks. Oxford University Press: Melbourne.

External links

Egretta
pied heron
Birds of New Guinea
Birds of New South Wales
Birds of the Northern Territory
Birds of Sulawesi
Birds of Queensland
pied heron
pied heron